The Venetian regional election of 1980 took place on 8 June 1980.

Events
Christian Democracy was by far the largest party, securing a full majority. After the election Christian Democrat Carlo Bernini formed a government which comprised briefly the Italian Democratic Socialist Party (1980–1981).

Results

Source: Regional Council of Veneto

References

Elections in Veneto
1980 elections in Italy